Conall mac Taidg (died c. 807) (Conall son of Tadc) was a king of the Picts from 785 until 789. Very little is recorded of Conall. He is mentioned twice by the Irish annals, the most reliable source for the history of northern Britain in the years around 800. He also appears in later king lists.

Annals
The Chronicle of Ireland survives only in later manuscripts. Of these, the Annals of Ulster contain two reports of Conall. The first, dated to 789, records "a battle between the Picts, in which Conall son of Tadc was defeated and escaped; and Constantín was victor". Constantín here is Caustantín mac Fergusa (d. 820), king of Fortriu. The second, in 807, reports "the killing of Conall son of Tadc, by Conall son of Aedacán in Cenn Tíre". Cenn Tíre is the Old Irish language form of Kintyre and Conall son of Aedacán is usually called Conall mac Áedáin.

King lists
Later evidence is provided by king lists and by Irish historical writings. The earliest of these may have been compiled during the ninth century, but none survives a manuscript of that date. A list of synchronisms--i.e., a series of known, datable events used to align Irish lists of kings to Scottish ones—was attributed to an Irish writer called Flann Mainistrech (Flann of Monasterboice) (d. 1056) in the eleventh century and provides another list of kings. Two manuscripts of Flann's work state that there were "sixteen kings in Scotland" between the death of Áed Allán (d. 743) and the death of Áed Findliath (d. 789). These sixteen begin with Dúngal mac Selbaig and end with Kenneth MacAlpin. Two kings named Conall, "Conall Coem, and another Conall, his brother", are said to have reigned between Domnall mac Caustantín and his father, Caustantín mac Fergusa, the same king of Fortriu who had defeated Conall in 789. The Duan Albanach, dated on internal evidence to rather later in the eleventh century, follows this by having Domnall followed by two Conalls and then Caustantín. It is generally assumed that the Duan and Flann aim to report the succession of kings in Dál Riata.

Conall is not included in any surviving genealogical material, but this is typical for the period. The Poppleton Manuscript Pictish king list includes a king named Canaul son of Tarla'a, son of Tang in some versions but simply omitted from others. This Canaul has generally been identified with Conall. The lists assign a reign of five years to this king who precedes Caustantín mac Fergusa.

King of Picts or Dál Riata?
Interpretations of the shadowy Conall mac Taidg are determined largely by the shifting views of historians with regard to Caustantín mac Fergusa and the later origins of the Kingdom of Alba, a subject where the consensus may have changed twice in the last few decades having previously been stable since the time of William Forbes Skene. Skene made Conall a king of the Picts, later reinterpretations made him first a king of the Picts, then, following his expulsion by Caustantín, a king in Dál Riata. Recent reinterpretations make him a king in Argyll throughout, but not necessarily the chief king.

References

 
 
 
 Broun, Dauvit, "Pictish Kings 761–839: Integration with Dál Riata or Separate Development" in Sally M. Foster (ed.), The St Andrews Sarcophagus: A Pictish masterpiece and its international connections. Four Courts, Dublin, 1998. 
 Clancy, Thomas Owen, "Iona in the kingdom of the Picts: a note" in The Innes Review, volume 55, number 1, 2004, pp. 73–76. ISSN 0020-157X
 

8th-century births
807 deaths
Pictish monarchs
8th-century Scottish monarchs